Noël Foré (23 December 1932 – 16 February 1994) was a Belgian professional road bicycle racer. His greatest victories were Paris–Roubaix in 1959 and the Tour of Flanders in 1963.

Palmarès 

1957
Dwars door Vlaanderen/Dwars door België
1958
Tour of Belgium
1959
Paris–Roubaix
1962
Tour of Belgium
1963
E3-prijs
Kuurne–Brussels–Kuurne
Tour of Flanders
1967
Rund om Köln

References

External links 

1932 births
1994 deaths
Belgian male cyclists
People from Maldegem
Cyclists from East Flanders
20th-century Belgian people